Sault Ste. Marie/Partridge Point Water Aerodrome, formerly , was adjacent to Sault Ste. Marie, Ontario, Canada.

The airport was classified as an airport of entry by Nav Canada and is staffed by the Canada Border Services Agency (CBSA). CBSA officers at this airport could handle general aviation aircraft only, with no more than 15 passengers.

This aerodrome was listed as permanently closed by NOTAM number 160284 issued by NavCanada in the fall of 2017.

See also
 List of airports in the Sault Ste. Marie, Ontario area

References

Transport in Sault Ste. Marie, Ontario
Defunct seaplane bases in Ontario